Schurz Communications is a South Bend, Indiana-based broadband media group and cloud services provider. It owned newspapers.

History 
The company was founded in 1872 by Alfred B. Miller and Elmer Crockett with the creation of the South Bend Tribune. Over the years the company grew through the acquisition of other newspapers, media outlets, radio and television stations, digital companies, broadband operations and cloud services provider. The expanding company was renamed Schurz Communications Inc. in 1976, when the newspapers division and the TV/broadcast division were split into separate entities.

In September 2015, Schurz announced it was selling its TV and radio stations to Gray Television. Gray then resold Schurz's radio stations to three different buyers upon completion of its purchase of the Schurz broadcasting unit.

In September 2016, The American News and Farm Forum, owned by Schurz, acquired The Public Opinion newspaper in Watertown, South Dakota from United Communications.

In February 2018, the company acquired the Ann Arbor, Michigan-based Online Tech. The compliant hybrid cloud provider serves nearly 500 clients across the Midwest with its network of seven data centers and full suite of hybrid cloud services. In December of that year, Online Tech acquired the assets and products of IT provider Neverfail. The acquisition includes Neverfail’s five cloud nodes and assets in North America, Europe and Asia-Pacific.

In January 2019, Schurz sold its publishing division and all its newspapers to GateHouse Media for $30 million. This included 20 regional papers and several special publications in Indiana, Maryland, Michigan, Pennsylvania and South Dakota. GateHouse later bought the Gannett newspaper chain, and the expanded network of newspapers adopted the Gannett name. 

In March 2019 Schurz Communications bought the city-owned local broadband company Burlington Telecom of Burlington, Vermont for a total of $30.8 million.

Current properties

Broadband systems
Antietam Broadband - Hagerstown, Maryland  
Burlington Telecom - Burlington, Vermont  
Hiawatha Broadband - Winona, Minnesota 
Long Lines Broadband - Sergeant Bluff, Iowa 
Orbitel Communications - Maricopa, Arizona

Cloud Managed Services 

 Otava - Ann Arbor, Michigan [1]

Former properties

Newspapers
 Imperial Valley Press - El Centro, California
 Times Mail - Bedford, Indiana
 Southside Times - Beech Grove, Indiana
 The Herald-Times - Bloomington, Indiana
 The Hoosier Topics - Cloverdale, Indiana
 Fishers Weekly - Fishers, Indiana
 Reporter-Times - Martinsville, Indiana
 Mooresville-Decatur Times - Mooresville, Indiana
 Noblesville Daily Times - Noblesville, Indiana
 South Bend Tribune - South Bend, Indiana (flagship)
 Evening World - Spencer, Indiana
 The Advocate-Messenger - Danville, Kentucky
 The Jessamine Journal - Nicholasville, Kentucky
 The Interior Journal - Stanford, Kentucky
 The Winchester Sun - Winchester, Kentucky
 The Herald-Mail - Hagerstown, Maryland
 Charlevoix Courier - Charlevoix, Michigan
 Gaylord Herald Times - Gaylord, Michigan
 Petoskey News-Review - Petoskey, Michigan
 Daily American - Somerset, Pennsylvania
 The American News - Aberdeen, South Dakota
 The Public Opinion - Watertown, South Dakota

Radio

Notes:
 1 Owned by Douglas Road Radio, Schurz held a minority interest in this company.

Television
 (**) – Indicates that it was built and signed on by Schurz.

Notes:
 1 Owned by Schurz, WAGT was operated by Media General under a shared services agreement, with WJBF.
 2 Owned by Entravision Communications, Schurz operated KDCU under a shared services agreement, with KWCH and KSCW.
 3 From February–May 2017, KGHZ used virtual channel 15, while K15CZ-D (later KYCW-LD, now KSPR-LD) switched to virtual channel 33.
 4 Owned by Schurz, KGHZ was operated Gray Television operated KGHZ under a shared services agreement. From 2007 to 2016, KGHZ (as KSPR) was owned by Perkin Media, LLC. Schurz operated the station under a joint sales agreement.

See also
Schurz Communications, Incorporated v. Federal Communications Commission and United States of America

References

External links
 

Companies based in St. Joseph County, Indiana
South Bend, Indiana
Mass media companies of the United States
Gannett
Gray Television